Lydia Mutsch (born 17 August 1961 in Dudelange) is a Luxembourgish politician. She served as Minister of Health and Minister for Equal Opportunities in the Bettel-Schneider ministry from December 2013 until December 2018.

Lydia Mutsch studied in Göttingen.  She has been a member of the national legislature, the Chamber of Deputies, in which she has sat since being first elected in 1989 until her appointment as Minister of Health. From 2000 to 2013, she was the Mayor of Esch-sur-Alzette, having previously been a member of the communal council since 1988.  She has been a member of the Luxembourg Socialist Workers' Party since 1987.

Footnotes

Mayors of Esch-sur-Alzette
Members of the Chamber of Deputies (Luxembourg)
Members of the Chamber of Deputies (Luxembourg) from Sud
Councillors in Esch-sur-Alzette
Luxembourg Socialist Workers' Party politicians
1961 births
Living people
People from Dudelange
Women mayors of places in Luxembourg